The Yuzawa-Yokote Road (湯沢横手道路 Yuzawa-Yokote Dōro) is a two-lane partially-tolled road in Akita Prefecture connecting the cities Yuzawa and Yokote while bypassing the original routing of Japan National Route 13. The road is jointly managed by the East Nippon Expressway Company and the Ministry of Land, Infrastructure, Transport and Tourism (MLIT). It is numbered E13 under the MLIT's "2016 Proposal for Realization of Expressway Numbering."

Route description
Distance markers on the road are derived from the distance markers of Route 13 rather than starting at zero at the origin of the road, so the beginning of the route at Route 13 in Yuzawa has a marker for  rather than 0.

History
The first section of Yuzawa-Yokote Road opened in July 1991. The entire road was opened to traffic on 26 August 2007.

List of major junctions
The entire route is in Akita Prefecture. Yuzawa-Yokote Road is a direct extension of National Route 13.

|colspan="8" style="text-align: center;"|Through as

References

Roads in Akita Prefecture
Toll roads in Japan